Union Township is a township in Benton County, in the U.S. state of Missouri.

Union Township was formed on June 2, 1840, named because it united parts of three previous townships.

References

Townships in Missouri
Townships in Benton County, Missouri